Alx Veliz is a Canadian singer-songwriter from Toronto, Ontario. He is best known for his hit single, "Dancing Kizomba".

Early life
Veliz is of Guatemalan and Jamaican descent. One of his grandmothers immigrated from Jamaica to Guatemala when she was sixteen. His grew up in a musical Guatemalan family, he started performing from a young age. By age 10, he was songwriting and rapping. In his teens, he delved deeper into production and rhythm, learning bass and drumming.  Veliz grew up in Brampton, Ontario.

Career
After signing with Universal Music Canada in 2015, he stormed the Billboard charts with his debut single "Dancing Kizomba," named after the Angolan dance movement that combines Western ballroom dance with African elements. The single was recorded in English and Spanish, both born from his desire to honor his roots and to increase exposure for Canadian-Latin music artists. Produced by Medy Landia, "Dancing Kizomba" combined a positive energy with Veliz' global style. "Dancing Kizomba" received over 35 million streams on Spotify and multiple remixes including a version with Don Omar. 
  His music is described as "synth-driven, Latin-rhythm-infused pop."

Discography

EPs

Singles

References

Year of birth missing (living people)
Living people
Canadian people of Guatemalan descent
Canadian people of Jamaican descent
Musicians from Toronto
Canadian male singer-songwriters
Canadian singer-songwriters
21st-century Canadian male musicians